Sergio García (born 1980) is a Spanish golfer.

Sergio García may also refer to:

 Sergio García Ramírez (born 1938), Mexican jurist and politician
 Sergio García Michel (1945–2010), Mexican film director
 Sergio García de Alba (born 1955), Mexican businessman and politician
 Sergio C. Garcia (born 1977), first undocumented immigrant to be admitted to practice as an attorney by the State Bar of California
 Sergio García (footballer, born 1982), Mexican footballer
 Sergio García (footballer, born 1983), Spanish footballer
 Sergio García (judoka) (born 1987), Mexican judoka
 Sergio García (swimmer) (born 1989), Spanish swimmer
 Sergio García (footballer, born 1989) (born 1989), Spanish footballer
 Sergio Garcia (actor) (born 1990), Filipino actor
 Sergio García (skater) (born 1990), Spanish vert skater
 Sergio García Mut (born 1991), Spanish footballer, see 2008 UEFA European Under-17 Championship
 Sergio García (boxer) (born 1992), Spanish boxer
 Sergio García (footballer, born 1996), Spanish footballer
 Sergio García (motorcyclist) (born 2003), Spanish motorcycle rider

See also
Sergi Garcia (disambiguation)